Sciaphyes is a genus of small carrion beetles in the family Leiodidae.

Species
These species belong to the genus Eucatops:
 Sciaphyes kawaharai Hoshina & Perreau, 2008
 Sciaphyes shestakovi Fresneda, Grebennikov & Ribera, 2011
 Sciaphyes sibiricus (Reitter, 1887)
 Sciaphyes japonicus Hayashi, Ogai & Nagasawa, 2015

References

Further reading

 

 

Leiodidae